"By the Way" is the sixth single from Theory of a Deadman's album Scars & Souvenirs, released on May 18, 2009. The song features Chris Daughtry and Robin Diaz on back-up vocals. It is about a girl leaving her boyfriend without saying anything to him and he now thinks about her all the time and wishes she'd come back. The Scars & Souvenirs album title comes from a line in this song: "Piled up from the years, all those scars and souvenirs".

Music video
The music video came out in the second week of August 2009. It shows Tyler Connolly walking around an abandoned house with his "former wife" as a ghost lurking around him. He picks up emotional objects such as his wedding picture. Near the end of the video, he turns into the ghost and the wife is actually real. She leaves the house with her friends, like he exclaims in the lyrics of the song. Neither Chris Daughtry nor Robin Diaz, who sing backing vocals on the song, are featured in the music video.

Chart positions

References

2009 singles
2000s ballads
Hard rock ballads
Theory of a Deadman songs
604 Records singles
2008 songs
Roadrunner Records singles
Songs written by Chris Daughtry
Songs written by Tyler Connolly